Réginald Arthur Villiers Forbes (18 November 1865 – 20 February 1952) was a British tennis player at the end of the 19th century. He won the French Open mixed doubles Championship with Yvonne Prévost in 1902 and 1903 when it was open only to French nationals or members of specific French clubs. He died in Dinard.

References

External links
 French Open mixed doubles winners

1865 births
1952 deaths
British male tennis players
French Championships (tennis) champions
Place of birth missing
19th-century British people
20th-century British people